{{Infobox television
| image              = Remix stars during their album release, December 2005.jpg
| caption            = Remix stars during their album release, December 2005
| genre              = 
| creator            = Rose Audio Visuals
| writer             = 
| based_on           = Rebelde Way
| director           = 
| creative_director  = 
| presenter          =
| starring           = 
| opentheme          = 
| music              = Pritam
| country            = India
| language           = Hindi
| num_episodes       = 348
| executive_producer = 
| producer           = 
| editor             = 
| camera             = Multi-camera
| runtime            = 
| network            = STAR One
| first_aired        = 
| last_aired         = 
| related            = Rebelde Way (2002)Rebelde (2004)Rebelde Way (2008)Corazón rebeldeRebelde (2011)Rebelde (2022) 
}}Remix is an Indian drama series produced by Rose Audio Visuals, which aired on STAR One. The series is a remake of the Argentine soap opera Rebelde Way. It appeared from 1 November 2004 to 20 July 2006.

Synopsis
The story is based on the lives of 12th-grade students in an elite school called Maurya High. The school servesthe rich and famous, and scholarship students from poorer families.

The four main characters are Tia Ahuja (the only daughter of fashion entrepreneur Sumit Ahuja), Anvesha Ray Banerjee (the only daughter of Bollywood filmstar Sonia Ray), Yuvraaj Dev (the brat son of Indian politician Yashwant Dev), and Ranveer Sisodia (from a middle-class Rajasthani family who comes to Maurya to avenge the death of his father with Sumit Ahuja). They form the music group "Remix" and become the singing sensation of the decade.

As the show progresses, two main relationships develop. Tia and Ranveer become attracted to each other and begin dating. Ashi and Yuvi also begin a love/hate relationship. Throughout the series, they go through various fights and misunderstandings.

The show ends with Tia and Anvesha becoming step-sisters as their parents Sumit Ahuja and Sonia Ray plan to get married. Ashi and Yuvi reconcile and resolve their differences. Tia and Ranveer also recognize their love for each other and end up happily together.

Cast
Main
Priya Wal as Anvesha "Ashi" Ray Banerjee
Raj Singh Arora as Yuvraaj "Yuvi" Dev
Shweta Gulati as Tia Ahuja
Karan Wahi as Ranveer Sisodia

Recurring

Guest appearances
Bappi Lahiri
Malaika Arora
Aasma
Arshad Warsi
Dino Morea

Soundtrack
The soundtrack of the show was sung by the Channel V band, Aasma. Music was provided by Jeet Ganguly and Pritam with lyrics by Peyush Dixit and Aamir Ali. The album was released on 8 December 2005. However, most of the tunes were released on the show before the album launch, excepting Boom''.

Notes

References

Star One (Indian TV channel) original programming
Indian teen drama television series
2004 Indian television series debuts
2006 Indian television series endings
Rose Audio Visuals
Indian television series based on non-Indian television series
Indian musical television series
Television series about fictional musicians
Television series about bullying
Television series about teenagers